James Conrad Shindler IV (born July 20, 1988) is an American professional golfer.

Shindler was born in Phoenix, Arizona. He played college golf at Texas A&M University, helping the team win the NCAA Division I Championship in 2009.

Shindler turned professional after graduating in 2011. He played on the Canadian Tour in 2013 and returned in 2016; his best finish was second place at the 2016 ATB Financial Classic. In 2017 he played on the Web.com Tour and won the Rex Hospital Open. He finished 17th on the money list to earn his 2018 PGA Tour card. He made only 9 cuts in 20 events in 2018, with a best finish of T15 at the Barbasol Championship. He finished 192nd on the FedEx Cup points list and returned to the Web.com Tour in 2019.

Professional wins (1)

Web.com Tour wins (1)

Web.com Tour playoff record (1–0)

See also
2017 Web.com Tour Finals graduates

References

External links
 
 

American male golfers
Texas A&M Aggies men's golfers
PGA Tour golfers
Korn Ferry Tour graduates
Golfers from Phoenix, Arizona
Golfers from Dallas
1988 births
Living people